JB is a Canadian hip hop musician from Toronto, Ontario. He is most noted as a two-time MuchMusic Video Award nominee for Best Rap Video, receiving nods at the 2008 MuchMusic Video Awards for "Fire in Ya Eyes" and at the 2009 MuchMusic Video Awards for "Move Your Body".

References

21st-century Canadian rappers
Canadian male rappers
Rappers from Toronto
Black Canadian musicians
Living people
Year of birth missing (living people)